is a train station located in Minamikyūshū, Japan. The station is unmanned and opened in 1963.

History 
In 1963, the Ibusuki Line was extended from Saijo Station to Makurazaki Station to become the Ibusuki Makurazaki Line. On this day, Ishigaki Station, Suisegawa Station, Sagaokawa Station, Matsugaura Station, Satsuma Shioya Station, Shirasawa Station, Satsuma Itashiki Station, and Makurazaki Station were also opened.

1987 (Showa 62) April 1-Kyushu Railway becomes a railway station due to the privatization of JNR

Lines 
Kyushu Railway Company
Ibusuki Makurazaki Line

Adjacent stations 

Railway stations in Kagoshima Prefecture
Railway stations in Japan opened in 1963